This is the list of railway stations in Basilicata, Italy. The stations are owned by Rete Ferroviaria Italiana (RFI) (a branch of the Italian state company Ferrovie dello Stato), and Ferrovie Appulo Lucane (FAL).

RFI stations

FAL stations

See also

Railway stations in Italy
Ferrovie dello Stato
Rail transport in Italy
High-speed rail in Italy
Transport in Italy

References

External links

 
Bal